Rippel is a surname. Notable people with the surname include:

Cassio Rippel (born 1978), Brazilian sport shooter
Sandra Rippel (born 1961), Canadian curler
Wally Rippel, American electrical engineer

See also
Ripple (disambiguation)

German-language surnames